is a model kit line produced by Kotobukiya, originally released in 2015 as a spin-off of its Frame Arms mecha line. A manga adaptation by Tsuneo Tsuneishi began serialization in Kadokawa Shoten's Comp Ace magazine in December 2016. An anime television series based on the line aired from April 3, 2017, to June 19, 2017. A film Frame Arms Girl: Kyakkyau Fufu na Wonderland was released on June 29, 2019.

Summary
Based on the original Frame Arms line, Frame Arms Girl features the robots from that line portrayed as anthropomorphic girls, known as F.A. Girls for short, who can be equipped with various armor and weapon parts, including those from the Frame Arms and M.S.G weapon series. The line was designed by Humikane Shimada, based on Takayuki Yanase original mech designs.

The anime adaptation follows a girl named Ao Gennai who is sent a prototype F.A. Girl known as Gourai and is tasked with helping her gather data on both battle and emotions. The two soon encounter more F.A. Girls, who Gourai battles against while also having various adventures alongside.

Characters

A human girl who is given the job of providing data for the F.A. Girls.

An F.A. Girl who is sent to Ao to gather emotion data. She is a ground-based fighter who can move quickly with tank-style treads but has a disadvantage over aerial types.

A bossy F.A. Girl who gets flustered easily. Equipped with wings, she specializes in aerial combat.

An energetic F.A. Girl who likes to cause mischief. Like Stylet, she is an aerial type who focuses on guided laser weapons.

They are oddly affectionate towards each other and take pleasure in torturing others, often omitting the use of armor in favor of powerful weaponry.

An F.A. girl who, along with the Materia Sisters, is the basis of every other F.A. Girl and, according to Stylet, has no physical body and only manifests herself during certain battles to carry out her programming. She was given a physical body after Gourai and Jinrai defeated her, loaded with the data generated during their battle. 

A proud F.A. Girl who has a particularly obsession with the Sengoku period and specializes in ninja techniques.

A powerful F.A. Girl who gave Gourai her first defeat, causing Gourai to improve further.

Ao's best friend who is obsessed with model kits and often provides Ao with the latest parts.

Media

Manga 
A manga prequel written by Kotobukiya and illustrated by Tsuneo Tsuneishi, titled , began serialization in Kadokawa Shoten's Comp Ace magazine from December 26, 2016.

Anime
A 12-episode anime television adaption aired on Tokyo MX between April 3, 2017, and June 19, 2017, also airing on BS11 and AT-X. The anime was directed by Keiichiro Kawaguchi at studios Zexcs and Studio A-Cat with scripts written by Deko Akao and the music is produced by Keigo Hoashi and Kakeru Ishihama. Sentai Filmworks have licensed it for home video and digital release. The series was streamed by the Anime Network. The opening theme is "Tiny Tiny" by Rie Murakawa while the ending theme is "Fullscratch Love", performed by the series' voice actresses.

A sequel film titled Frame Arms Girl: Kyakkyau Fufu na Wonderland has been announced. It was revealed that the film will be a compilation film with new added footage.  The film premiered on June 29, 2019.

Note

References

External links
  
  
 Frame Arms Girl Official on YouTube 
 

2016 manga
Kadokawa Dwango franchises
Kadokawa Shoten manga
Mecha anime and manga
Scale modeling
Seinen manga
Sentai Filmworks
Studio A-Cat
Tokyo MX original programming
Zexcs